A private protected area, also known as a private reserve, is not an official category within IUCN's Protected Area guidelines, but includes those protected areas that fall under geographical space that is privately owned, 'kept aside' for public benefit, and will be likely to fall into any one of the IUCN Protected Area Management Categories.

The IUCN defines a private protected area as “a land parcel of any size that is...": 

 "Predominantly managed for biodiversity conservation;
 "Protected with or without formal government recognition; and 
 "Is owned or otherwise secured by individuals, communities, corporations, or non-governmental organisations.”

A Private Protected Area represents a private initiative towards preserving biodiversity, which indicates the importance of the involvement of individuals, corporations, and other private bodies in the understanding and maintenance of protected areas. In Eastern and Southern Africa, privately owned lands play an important role in conserving critical biodiversity. Private protected areas in Southern Africa alone protect millions of ecologically important areas, especially in critical buffer zones and corridor areas.

See also
Biodiversity hotspot
Conservation biology
Crisis ecoregion
Ecoregion
High-Biodiversity Wilderness Area
Last of the Wild
Man and the Biosphere Programme
Private protected areas in Australia
Private protected areas of India
Privately owned public space

References

External links
 A-Z of Areas of Biodiversity Importance: Private Protected Areas
 Protected Planet
 UNEP-WCMC Datasets, Tools and Reports

Protected areas